Jonathan Evans may refer to:

 Jonathan Evans (American football) (born 1981), fullback
 Jonathan Evans (politician) (born 1950), British lawyer and Conservative Party Member of Parliament
 Jonathan Evans (rugby union) (born 1992), Welsh rugby union player
 Jonathan Evans, Baron Evans of Weardale (born 1958), Director General of the British Security Service, from 2007 to 2013
 Jonathan St B. T. Evans (born 1948), British cognitive psychologist

See also
 John Evans (disambiguation)